The women's 100 metres event at the 2013 Asian Athletics Championships was held at the Shree Shiv Chhatrapati Sports Complex on 4 July.

Medalists

Results

Heats
First 2 in each heat (Q) and 2 best performers (q) advanced to the final.

Wind: Heat 1: -0.1 m/s, Heat 2: -0.4 m/s, Heat 3: -0.5 m/s

Final
Wind: -0.3 m/s

References
Results

100 Women's
100 metres at the Asian Athletics Championships
2013 in women's athletics